Tuta atriplicella is a moth in the family Gelechiidae. It was described by Kieffer and Jörgensen in 1910. It is found in Argentina.

The length of the forewings is 7–8 mm. The forewings are dull grey-whitish, weakly shining yellowish and sprinkled with olive-greyish and blackish in the terminal area. The hindwings are a little darker, but more shining yellowish.

References

	

Gnorimoschemini
Moths described in 1910